Zdeněk Douša (born 5 March 1947) is a Czech former basketball player. He was voted to the Czechoslovakian 20th Century Team in 2001.

With the senior Czechoslovakian national team, Douša competed in the men's tournament at the 1972 Summer Olympics, the 1976 Summer Olympics, and the 1980 Summer Olympics. With Czechoslovakia, he also won the bronze medal at the 1977 EuroBasket.

See also
Czechoslovak Basketball League career stats leaders

References

External links
FIBA Profile

1947 births
Living people
Czechoslovak men's basketball players
Olympic basketball players of Czechoslovakia
Basketball players at the 1972 Summer Olympics
Basketball players at the 1976 Summer Olympics
Basketball players at the 1980 Summer Olympics
Sportspeople from Prague
1970 FIBA World Championship players
1974 FIBA World Championship players
1978 FIBA World Championship players
Czech men's basketball players